James Massa (born September 3, 1960) is an American prelate of the Roman Catholic Church. He has been serving as an auxiliary bishop of the Diocese of Brooklyn in New York City since 2015 and as rector of St. Joseph Seminary in Yonkers, New York.

Biography

Early life 
James Massa was born on September 3, 1960, in Jersey City, New Jersey. He studied at Yale Divinity School in and the Seminary of the Immaculate Conception in Huntington, New York. He holds a Bachelor of Arts degree from Boston College (1982) and a Master of Theology degree from Yale Divinity School (1985).

Priesthood 
Massa was ordained a priest for the Diocese of Brooklyn on Oct. 25, 1986 by Bishop Francis Mugavero.  After his ordination, Massa held the following positions:

 Assistant pastor at Our Lady Queen of Martyrs Parish in Forest Hills, New York (1986-1990)
 Adjunct professor at Saint John's University in Queens, New York (1987-1989)
 Chaplain at Queens College, City University of New York in Queens (1990-1993)
 Chaplain and professor at Kansas Newman College in Wichita, Kansas (1993-1996) 
 Professor at Pope St. John XXIII National Seminary in Weston, Massachusetts (1997-2001) and the Seminary of the Immaculate Conception in Lloyd Harbor, New Yor, (2001-2005)
 Professor at Saint Joseph Seminary since 2012 and rector since 2020

Massa received his Doctor of Systematic Theology degree from Fordham University in New York City (1997), where he was supervised by future Cardinal Avery Dulles. Massa has published several articles and book reviews.

Massa served as executive director of the Ecumenical and Interreligious Committee of the US Conference of Catholic Bishops from 2005 to 2011.  He became a consultant to the Pontifical Council for Interreligious Dialogue in 2007. Massa was named as moderator of the curia for the diocese and administrator of Holy Name Parish in Brooklyn in 2014.

Auxiliary Bishop of Brooklyn
Massa was appointed titular bishop of Bardstown and auxiliary bishop of the Diocese of Brooklyn on May 19, 2015, by, Pope Francis. He received his episcopal consecration by Bishop Nicholas DiMarzio on July 20, 2015. In addition to English, Massa speaks Spanish and German.

See also
 

 Catholic Church hierarchy
 Catholic Church in the United States
 Historical list of the Catholic bishops of the United States
 List of Catholic bishops of the United States
 Lists of patriarchs, archbishops, and bishops

References

External links
 Roman Catholic Diocese of Brooklyn Official Site

Episcopal succession

1960 births
Living people
21st-century American Roman Catholic titular bishops
Yale Divinity School alumni
Boston College alumni
Fordham University alumni
Bishops appointed by Pope Francis